Cyrtodactylus paradoxus  is a species of gecko that is endemic to some islands in southern Vietnam.

References 

Cyrtodactylus
Reptiles described in 1997
Taxa named by Ilya Darevsky